Diamond Princess can refer to:

 Diamond Princess (album), by American rapper Trina
 Diamond Princess (ship), a cruise ship operated by Princess Cruises
 Princess cut diamond, a popular style of cutting a diamond for jewellery
 Diamond Princess, a 2007 album by Miliyah Kato